Swisher County is a county located in the U.S. state of Texas. As of the 2020 census, its population was 6,971. Its county seat is Tulia. The county was created in 1876 and later organized in 1890. It is named for James G. Swisher, a soldier of the Texas Revolution and signer of the Texas Declaration of Independence.

At one time, the large JA Ranch, founded by Charles Goodnight and John George Adair, and later owned by Goodnight and Cornelia Adair, reached into six counties, including Swisher.

History

Native Americans

Apachean cultures roamed the county until Comanche dominated around 1700. The Comanches were defeated by the United States Army in the Red River War of 1874. No significant combat occurred in the county. After the 1874 battle of Palo Duro Canyon, Ranald S. Mackenzie ordered 1450 Indian horses shot.  The Buffalo Hunters' War of 1876 was an attempt by the Comanches to drive out the white man and stop depletion of their hunting grounds.

County established and growth

In 1876 the Texas state legislature carved Swisher County from Young and Bexar districts.  The county was organized in 1880, and Tulia, became the county seat.

The area was by and large unsettled until the JA Ranch of Charles Goodnight came in 1883, which added the Tule Ranch.

Although settlers gradually arrived, the county was dominated by ranching the remainder of the 19th century. Good underground water at shallow depths gave to windmills that facilitated the stock-farmer.

In 1906, the Santa Fe Railroad branch line from Amarillo came through the county and later connected the county with Hale County, and with Lubbock by 1910, giving Swisher a major north–south rail line and boosting the economy.

The Great Depression had a devastating effect on the county's economy, somewhat relieved by road work. The stimulus of World War II demand and, particularly, the development of large-scale irrigation in the area, led to the revival of the county's economy.

The first successful extensive local use of underground water from the Ogallala Aquifer came in 1936.

In 2002 the county had 578 farms and ranches covering , 69 percent of which were devoted to crops and 30 percent to pasture.

The Ozark Trail

Rural Texas in the early 20th century was often connected by unpaved routes, often of caliche or other rock and dirt paths.  Swisher's road structure fell into this category.
In 1920 the Ozark Trail served as a predecessor to today's intra-continental highway structure.  The Ozark Trail was a highway network maintained by local entities or private citizens from Arkansas and Missouri through Kansas, Oklahoma, Louisiana, and Texas, to New Mexico.  In Texas the trail was made of graded and upgraded roads.  Collingsworth, Childress, Hall, Briscoe, Swisher, Castro, and Parmer counties along with Curry and Roosevelt counties in New Mexico raised $10,000 in 1920 to erect markers along already existing roads to mark the Ozark Trail from Oklahoma across Texas to New Mexico.  By the mid-1920s Tulia was linked to Nazareth, Dimmitt, and Bovina by State Highway 86, to Canyon and Amarillo by U.S. Highway 385 (now U.S. 87 or Interstate Highway 27), to Silverton by State Highway 80, and to Plainview and Lubbock by U.S. 385.

Geography

Major highways
  Interstate 27
  U.S. Highway 87
  State Highway 86

Adjacent counties
 Randall County (north)
 Armstrong County (northeast)
 Briscoe County (east)
 Floyd County (southeast)
 Hale County (south)
 Castro County (west)

Demographics

Note: the US Census treats Hispanic/Latino as an ethnic category. This table excludes Latinos from the racial categories and assigns them to a separate category. Hispanics/Latinos can be of any race.

As of the census of 2000, there were 8,378 people, 2,925 households, and 2,152 families residing in the county.  The population density was 9 people per square mile (4/km2).  There were 3,315 housing units at an average density of 4 per square mile (1/km2).  The racial makeup of the county was 71.75% White, 5.85% Black or African American, 0.54% Native American, 0.16% Asian, 0.02% Pacific Islander, 19.41% from other races, and 2.28% from two or more races.  35.22% of the population were Hispanic or Latino of any race.

There were 2,925 households, out of which 35.70% had children under the age of 18 living with them, 60.20% were married couples living together, 9.50% had a female householder with no husband present, and 26.40% were non-families. 24.10% of all households were made up of individuals, and 13.80% had someone living alone who was 65 years of age or older.  The average household size was 2.65 and the average family size was 3.15.

In the county, the population was spread out, with 27.90% under the age of 18, 10.30% from 18 to 24, 25.50% from 25 to 44, 20.40% from 45 to 64, and 15.90% who were 65 years of age or older.  The median age was 35 years. For every 100 females there were 109.20 males.  For every 100 females age 18 and over, there were 111.30 males.

The median income for a household in the county was $29,846, and the median income for a family was $34,444. Males had a median income of $25,164 versus $20,448 for females. The per capita income for the county was $14,326.  About 14.20% of families and 17.40% of the population were below the poverty line, including 24.20% of those under age 18 and 11.90% of those age 65 or over.

Communities

Cities
 Kress
 Tulia (county seat)

Town
 Happy (small part in Randall County)

Unincorporated communities
 Love
 Vigo Park

Politics
Whereas the counties to its north in the Panhandle proper became overwhelmingly Republican at a Presidential level with Dwight D. Eisenhower in the 1950s, Swisher County continued to favour the Democratic Party for another four decades, even being narrowly won by Walter Mondale in 1984 when he came within 3,819 votes of losing all fifty states. During the twentieth century the only Republicans to carry Swisher County were Herbert Hoover in 1928 due to intense anti-Catholic sentiment against Al Smith, Dwight D. Eisenhower in 1952, and Richard Nixon in 1972.

Like the rest of the Bible Belt, due to opposition to the Democratic Party's liberal positions on social issues Swisher has trended powerfully Republican and in the last six elections the Republican nominee has won more than 64 percent of the vote – over seven percent more than Nixon won in his 3,000-plus-county landslide in 1972.

Education
School districts:
 Happy Independent School District
 Kress Independent School District
 Tulia Independent School District

All of the county is in the service area of Amarillo College.

See also 

 Dry counties
 List of museums in the Texas Panhandle
 Recorded Texas Historic Landmarks in Swisher County

References

External links
 Swisher County government’s website
 Swisher County in Handbook of Texas Online
 Swisher County Profile from the Texas Association of Counties

 
1890 establishments in Texas
Populated places established in 1890
Texas Panhandle
Majority-minority counties in Texas